This is list of peninsulas and capes in Estonia. The list is incomplete.

References 

Peninsulas
 
Estonia